Wojciech Theiner (born 25 June 1986 in Ruda Śląska) is a Polish high jumper.

He finished fifth at the 2003 World Youth Championships, won the silver medal at the 2005 European Junior Championships and competed at the 2006 IAAF World Indoor Championships without reaching the final.

His personal best is 2.32 metres, achieved on 2 July 2014 in Katowice.

Achievements

References

1986 births
Living people
Polish male high jumpers
Sportspeople from Ruda Śląska
Athletes (track and field) at the 2016 Summer Olympics
Olympic athletes of Poland
Universiade medalists in athletics (track and field)
Universiade silver medalists for Poland
Competitors at the 2013 Summer Universiade
Medalists at the 2011 Summer Universiade